The African Journal of Health Sciences is a peer-reviewed healthcare journal covering research and policy issues in the health sciences and related disciplines.

External links 
 
 Online access at Bioline International
 African Journal of Health Sciences at African Journals Online

Open access journals
Healthcare journals
Publications established in 1994
English-language journals